Dorianne Theuma (born 17 May 1984) is a Maltese football midfielder playing for Swieqi.

International goals

Honours
Mosta FC
Runners-up
 Maltese First Division: 2011–12, 2012–13

References

External links
 

1984 births
Living people
Maltese women's footballers
Malta women's international footballers
Women's association football midfielders
FIFA Century Club